Aleksander Denstad With (born 30 June 1987 in Trondheim) is a Norwegian who won season 4 of the TV  show Idol in May 2006, becoming the youngest person ever to win the competition.

Aleksander released his first album, titled 'Coming Home', on 23 October 2006. The album was a major success and peaked at #4 on the Top 40 Norwegian Albums Chart upon release. So far, "A Little Too Perfect", "The Other Side" and "Free Ride" have been released as singles from the album.

On 1 December 2007, Aleksander performed alongside Norwegian Pop-Rock artist, Marion Raven, at the Norwegian "Idol Gives Back" show.

Pre-Idol

WimpyLime were an unsigned project Aleksander and his former girlfriend, Vivian Sørmeland (who came third in Idol (Norway) Season 4) were a part of from the summer of 2004 until Idol in 2006. WimpyLime wrote all of their material as a group and together could play the keyboard, piano, guitar, bass, and drums. Aleksander and Vivian were the band's lead vocalists.  Only two demos clips have leaked from WimpyLime's recorded catalog, one titled "Southern Skies" and another titled "The Secret". Members: Vivian Sørmeland, Aleksander With, Olav S. Flaa, Arne Fredrik Lånke

Norwegian Idol 2006 Performances
Audition: "Dancing Shoes" Gavin DeGraw
Top 40: "Chariot" by Gavin DeGraw 
Top 12: "Trouble" by Coldplay
Top 11: "American Woman" by Lenny Kravitz 
Top 10: "Have Fun,Go Mad" by Blair 
Top 9:  "Unloved" by Espen Lind
Top 8:  "I Don't Wanna Be" by Gavin DeGraw 
Top 7:  "The Way You Make Me Feel" by Michael Jackson 
Top 6:  "Glorious" by Andreas Johnson 
Top 5:  "Spider-Man Theme" by Michael Bublé 
Top 4:  "Everybody Hurts" by R.E.M. 
Top 4:  "One" (duet with Vivian Sørmeland) by U2 and Mary J. Blige 
Top 3:  "I've Been Losing You" by a-ha 
Top 3:  "Kiss From A Rose" by Seal 
Finale: "Glorious" by Andreas Johnson 
Finale: "Kiss From A Rose" by Seal 
Finale: "A Little Too Perfect" (Winning Single)

Discography

Albums

Singles

External links
 Aleksander With , Official Site
 Aleksander With, Official Myspace
 Aleksander With, Blog/Vlog

Wimpylime
 Official Site  
 Official Myspace

1987 births
Living people
Idols (TV series) winners
Idol (Norwegian TV series) participants
Norwegian pop singers
Musicians from Trondheim
Norwegian male pianists
21st-century Norwegian singers
21st-century pianists
21st-century Norwegian male singers